Sankt Marein bei Neumarkt is a former municipality in the district of Murau in the Austrian state of Styria. Since the 2015 Styria municipal structural reform, it is part of the municipality Neumarkt in der Steiermark.

Geography
The municipality lies about 20 km southeast of Murau.

References

Cities and towns in Murau District